The Goya Award for Best Original Score (Mejor música original) is one of the Goya Awards, Spain's principal national film awards. The category has been presented ever since the first edition of the Goya Awards. Spanish folk band Milladoiro was the first winner of the award for their work in the film Half of Heaven (1986). Composer Alberto Iglesias holds the record of most wins and nominations for this award, winning eleven times out of seventeen nominations.
 
In the list below the winner of the award for each year is shown first, followed by the other nominees.

Winners and nominees

1980s

1990s

2000s

2010s

2020s

See also

References

External links
Official site

Original Score
Film awards for best score